Grant Connell and Patrick Galbraith were the defending champions, but lost in the second round to Mark Draper and Scott Draper.

Olivier Delaître and Jeff Tarango won the title by defeating Petr Korda and Cyril Suk 1–6, 6–3, 6–2 in the final.

Seeds
The first four seeds received a bye to the second round.

Draw

Finals

Top half

Bottom half

References

External links
 Official results archive (ATP)
 Official results archive (ITF)

1995 ATP Tour